George Bromley may refer to:

George Bromley (politician) (c. 1526–1589), MP for Liskeard, Much Wenlock and Shropshire
George Bromley (athlete), see 1951 in New Zealand
Sir George Pauncefote-Bromley, 2nd Baronet (1753–1808), of the Bromley baronets
 George Bromley, founder of shoe firm Russell & Bromley

See also
Bromley (disambiguation)